Sir  Thomas Watts (1 July 1868 – 3 June 1951) was a Conservative Party politician in the United Kingdom.

A medical doctor by profession, Watts studied at the Durham University College of Medicine (B.S., 1889; M.D., 1892).

He was Member of Parliament (MP) for Manchester Withington from 1922 to 1923, and from 1924 to 1929. He was knighted in 1928 Birthday Honours, for political and public services.

References

External links 
 

1868 births
1951 deaths
Conservative Party (UK) MPs for English constituencies
UK MPs 1922–1923
UK MPs 1924–1929
Alumni of Durham University College of Medicine